The 1996 California Angels season involved the Angels finishing 4th in the American League West with a record of 70 wins and 91 losses.

The season was notable for being the final season the franchise bore the "California Angels" moniker, as the team name was changed to "Anaheim Angels" the following season.

The Angels used 29 different pitchers during the season, the most of any MLB team in 1996.

Offseason
November 21, 1995: Randy Velarde was signed as a free agent with the California Angels.
December 6, 1995: Mike Aldrete signed as a free agent with the California Angels.
December 7, 1995: Scott Sanderson was signed as a free agent with the California Angels.
December 18, 1995: Todd Frohwirth was signed as a free agent with the California Angels.
January 9, 1996: Jim Abbott signed as a free agent with the California Angels.
February 6, 1996: Mark Eichhorn was signed as a free agent with the California Angels. 
March 25, 1996: Ricky Jordan was purchased by the Seattle Mariners from the California Angels.

Regular season

Season standings

Record vs. opponents

Game log

|- bgcolor="ffbbbb"
| 1 || April 2 || Brewers || 9–15 || Wickander || Finley (0–1) || — || 27,836 || 0–1
|- bgcolor="ccffcc"
| 2 || April 3 || Brewers || 3–2 (11) || James (1–0) || Lloyd || — || 15,024 || 1–1
|- bgcolor="ccffcc"
| 3 || April 5 || White Sox || 7–6 (11) || James (2–0) || McCaskill || — || 22,812 || 2–1
|- bgcolor="ffbbbb"
| 4 || April 6 || White Sox || 4–8 || Fernandez || Abbott (0–1) || — || 26,447 || 2–2
|- bgcolor="ccffcc"
| 5 || April 7 || White Sox || 6–5 || Finley (1–1) || Alvarez || Percival (1) || 16,970 || 3–2
|- bgcolor="ffbbbb"
| 6 || April 9 || @ Blue Jays || 0–5 || Hentgen || Langston (0–1) || — || 36,616 || 3–3
|- bgcolor="ccffcc"
| 7 || April 10 || @ Blue Jays || 2–1 || Holzemer (1–0) || Guzman || Percival (2) || 25,446 || 4–3
|- bgcolor="ffbbbb"
| 8 || April 11 || @ Blue Jays || 4–7 || Hanson || Abbott (0–2) || Timlin || 25,512 || 4–4
|- bgcolor="ccffcc"
| 9 || April 12 || @ Tigers || 5–4 || Finley (2–1) || Lira || Percival (3) || 9,921 || 5–4
|- bgcolor="ffbbbb"
| 10 || April 13 || @ Tigers || 5–9 || Keagle || Sanderson (0–1) || — || 11,719 || 5–5
|- bgcolor="ffbbbb"
| 11 || April 14 || @ Tigers || 4–5 || Lewis || James (2–1) || — || 12,009 || 5–6
|- bgcolor="ffbbbb"
| 12 || April 15 || @ Mariners || 10–11 || Charlton || Eichhorn (0–1) || — || 36,960 || 5–7
|- bgcolor="ffbbbb"
| 13 || April 16 || @ Mariners || 3–5 || Johnson || Abbott (0–3) || — || 25,404 || 5–8
|- bgcolor="ccffcc"
| 14 || April 17 || Blue Jays || 5–1 || Finley (3–1) || Quantrill || — || 15,361 || 6–8
|- bgcolor="ccffcc"
| 15 || April 18 || Blue Jays || 9–6 || James (3–1) || Ware || Percival (4) || 25,083 || 7–8
|- bgcolor="ccffcc"
| 16 || April 19 || Tigers || 4–3 || Langston (1–1) || Myers || — || 32,693 || 8–8
|- bgcolor="ccffcc"
| 17 || April 20 || Tigers || 2–1 || Grimsley (1–0) || Keagle || Percival (5) || 25,685 || 9–8
|- bgcolor="ccffcc"
| 18 || April 21 || Tigers || 6–5 || Eichhorn (1–1) || Lewis || Percival (6) || 36,733 || 10–8
|- bgcolor="ccffcc"
| 19 || April 22 || Tigers || 6–5 || James (4–1) || Christopher || Percival (7) || 17,039 || 11–8
|- bgcolor="ccffcc"
| 20 || April 24 || @ Brewers || 4–3 || Boskie (1–0) || McDonald || Percival (8) || 7,051 || 12–8
|- bgcolor="ffbbbb"
| 21 || April 25 || @ Brewers || 5–6 || Fetters || James (4–2) || — || 6,707 || 12–9
|- bgcolor="ffbbbb"
| 22 || April 27 || @ White Sox || 1–2 || Fernandez || Abbott (0–4) || Hernandez || 18,139 || 12–10
|- bgcolor="ffbbbb"
| 23 || April 28 || @ White Sox || 1–10 || Baldwin || Finley (3–2) || — || 15,574 || 12–11
|- bgcolor="ffbbbb"
| 24 || April 29 || @ White Sox || 3–4 || Alvarez || Grimsley (1–1) || Hernandez || 12,549 || 12–12
|- bgcolor="ccffcc"
| 25 || April 30 || @ Athletics || 7–3 || Langston (2–1) || Prieto || — || 7,154 || 13–12
|-

|- bgcolor="ccffcc"
| 26 || May 1 || @ Athletics || 6–4 || Boskie (2–0) || Van Poppel || Percival (9) || 6,721 || 14–12
|- bgcolor="ccffcc"
| 27 || May 2 || @ Athletics || 3–1 || Abbott (1–4) || Johns || Percival (10) || 9,102 || 15–12
|- bgcolor="ccffcc"
| 28 || May 3 || Twins || 4–1 || Finley (4–2) || Robertson || Percival (11) || 24,505 || 16–12
|- bgcolor="ccffcc"
| 29 || May 4 || Twins || 5–2 || Grimsley (2–1) || Rodriguez || — || 29,264 || 17–12
|- bgcolor="ccffcc"
| 30 || May 5 || Twins || 5–1 || Boskie (3–0) || Hawkins || — || 35,541 || 18–12
|- bgcolor="ffbbbb"
| 31 || May 6 || Royals || 4–9 || Belcher || Leftwich (0–1) || Pichardo || 14,447 || 18–13
|- bgcolor="ffbbbb"
| 32 || May 7 || Royals || 3–5 || Valera || Abbott (1–5) || Montgomery || 14,657 || 18–14
|- bgcolor="ffbbbb"
| 33 || May 8 || Royals || 1–3 (14) || Pichardo || Eichhorn (1–2) || — || 16,210 || 18–15
|- bgcolor="ffbbbb"
| 34 || May 9 || Royals || 2–8 || Gubicza || Grimsley (2–2) || — || 15,302 || 18–16
|- bgcolor="ccffcc"
| 35 || May 10 || Indians || 13–8 || Boskie (4–0) || Lopez || — || 23,522 || 19–16
|- bgcolor="ffbbbb"
| 36 || May 11 || Indians || 5–6 || McDowell || Sanderson (0–2) || Mesa || 32,102 || 19–17
|- bgcolor="ffbbbb"
| 37 || May 12 || Indians || 1–4 || Poole || Percival (0–1) || Mesa || 22,768 || 19–18
|- bgcolor="ffbbbb"
| 38 || May 14 || @ Red Sox || 3–4 (12) || Belinda || Boskie (4–1) || — || 22,450 || 19–19
|- bgcolor="ffbbbb"
| 39 || May 15 || @ Red Sox || 6–17 || Moyer || Grimsley (2–3) || — || 23,455 || 19–20
|- bgcolor="ffbbbb"
| 40 || May 17 || @ Yankees || 5–8 || Pettitte || Abbott (1–6) || Rivera || 19,087 || 19–21
|- bgcolor="ffbbbb"
| 41 || May 18 || @ Yankees || 3–7 || Rogers || Williams (0–1) || Rivera || 22,821 || 19–22
|- bgcolor="ccffcc"
| 42 || May 19 || @ Yankees || 10–1 || Finley (5–2) || Kamieniecki || — || 37,326 || 20–22
|- bgcolor="ffbbbb"
| 43 || May 20 || @ Orioles || 1–13 || Wells || Grimsley (2–4) || — || 43,492 || 20–23
|- bgcolor="ccffcc"
| 44 || May 21 || @ Orioles || 5–2 || Boskie (5–1) || Krivda || Percival (12) || 39,974 || 21–23
|- bgcolor="ffbbbb"
| 45 || May 22 || @ Orioles || 5–10 || Haynes || Abbott (1–7) || McDowell || 45,817 || 21–24
|- bgcolor="ccffcc"
| 46 || May 24 || Red Sox || 3–1 || Finley (6–2) || Sele || Percival (13) || 19,550 || 22–24
|- bgcolor="ffbbbb"
| 47 || May 25 || Red Sox || 3–10 || Gordon || Williams (0–2) || — || 23,972 || 22–25
|- bgcolor="ccffcc"
| 48 || May 26 || Red Sox || 12–2 || Boskie (6–1) || Eshelman || — || 23,828 || 23–25
|- bgcolor="ffbbbb"
| 49 || May 27 || Yankees || 5–16 || Pettitte || Abbott (1–8) || — || 20,926 || 23–26
|- bgcolor="ccffcc"
| 50 || May 28 || Yankees || 1–0 || Grimsley (3–4) || Rogers || — || 17,284 || 24–26
|- bgcolor="ccffcc"
| 51 || May 29 || Yankees || 4–0 || Finley (7–2) || Mendoza || — || 19,246 || 25–26
|- bgcolor="ccffcc"
| 52 || May 31 || Orioles || 10–3 || Langston (3–1) || Wells || — || 21,603 || 26–26
|-

|- bgcolor="ccffcc"
| 53 || June 1 || Orioles || 8–3 || Boskie (7–1) || Haynes || — || 35,350 || 27–26
|- bgcolor="ffbbbb"
| 54 || June 2 || Orioles || 1–14 || Erickson || Abbott (1–9) || — || 33,704 || 27–27
|- bgcolor="ffbbbb"
| 55 || June 3 || @ Twins || 3–9 || Trombley || Finley (7–3) || — || 10,589 || 27–28
|- bgcolor="ffbbbb"
| 56 || June 4 || @ Twins || 3–5 || Rodriguez || Grimsley (3–5) || Guardado || 10,899 || 27–29
|- bgcolor="ffbbbb"
| 57 || June 5 || @ Twins || 3–14 || Aldred || Langston (3–2) || Hansell || 10,639 || 27–30
|- bgcolor="ffbbbb"
| 58 || June 7 || @ Indians || 3–4 || McDowell || Boskie (7–2) || Mesa || 42,260 || 27–31
|- bgcolor="ffbbbb"
| 59 || June 8 || @ Indians || 0–5 || Hershiser || Finley (7–4) || — || 42,267 || 27–32
|- bgcolor="ccffcc"
| 60 || June 9 || @ Indians || 8–6 (13) || Hancock (1–0) || Tavarez || — || 42,237 || 28–32
|- bgcolor="ccffcc"
| 61 || June 10 || @ Royals || 7–5 (10) || McElroy (1–0) || Pugh || Percival (14) || 15,691 || 29–32
|- bgcolor="ccffcc"
| 62 || June 11 || @ Royals || 11–9 || McElroy (2–0) || Valera || Percival (15) || 16,687 || 30–32
|- bgcolor="ccffcc"
| 63 || June 12 || @ Royals || 4–3 (10) || McElroy (3–0) || Montgomery || Percival (16) || 15,428 || 31–32
|- bgcolor="ccffcc"
| 64 || June 13 || Blue Jays || 6–4 || Finley (8–4) || Guzman || James (1) || 20,528 || 32–32
|- bgcolor="ccffcc"
| 65 || June 14 || Blue Jays || 7–4 || Grimsley (4–5) || Hanson || Percival (17) || 18,503 || 33–32
|- bgcolor="ccffcc"
| 66 || June 15 || Blue Jays || 7–5 || Langston (4–2) || Crabtree || Percival (18) || 40,352 || 34–32
|- bgcolor="ffbbbb"
| 67 || June 16 || Blue Jays || 4–6 || Quantrill || Abbott (1–10) || Timlin || 22,979 || 34–33
|- bgcolor="ccffcc"
| 68 || June 17 || White Sox || 9–8 (13) || Hancock (2–0) || McCaskill || — || 17,836 || 35–33
|- bgcolor="ccffcc"
| 69 || June 18 || White Sox || 5–4 || Finley (9–4) || Simas || Percival (19) || 19,213 || 36–33
|- bgcolor="ccffcc"
| 70 || June 19 || White Sox || 14–2 || McElroy (4–0) || Alvarez || — || 22,960 || 37–33
|- bgcolor="ccffcc"
| 71 || June 20 || @ Brewers || 10–3 || Langston (5–2) || Givens || — || 16,034 || 38–33
|- bgcolor="ffbbbb"
| 72 || June 21 || @ Brewers || 5–10 || McDonald || Abbott (1–11) || — || 16,274 || 38–34
|- bgcolor="ccffcc"
| 73 || June 22 || @ Brewers || 6–4 || Boskie (8–2) || Miranda || Percival (20) || 35,464 || 39–34
|- bgcolor="ffbbbb"
| 74 || June 23 || @ Brewers || 4–8 || Garcia || Finley (9–5) || — || 17,051 || 39–35
|- bgcolor="ffbbbb"
| 75 || June 24 || @ White Sox || 2–4 || Alvarez || James (4–3) || Hernandez || — || 39–36
|- bgcolor="ccffcc"
| 76 || June 24 || @ White Sox || 6–4 || Hancock (3–0) || Sirotka || Percival (21) || 24,469 || 40–36
|- bgcolor="ffbbbb"
| 77 || June 25 || @ White Sox || 2–3 || Tapani || Langston (5–3) || Hernandez || 23,270 || 40–37
|- bgcolor="ffbbbb"
| 78 || June 27 || Athletics || 2–18 || Johns || Boskie (8–3) || — || 23,503 || 40–38
|- bgcolor="ffbbbb"
| 79 || June 28 || Athletics || 3–6 || Chouinard || Finley (9–6) || — || 32,380 || 40–39
|- bgcolor="ffbbbb"
| 80 || June 29 || Athletics || 9–11 || Groom || Monteleone (0–1) || — || 26,565 || 40–40
|- bgcolor="ccffcc"
| 81 || June 30 || Athletics || 1–0 || Hancock (4–0) || Wasdin || Percival (22) || 19,284 || 41–40
|-

|- bgcolor="ffbbbb"
| 82 || July 1 || Rangers || 6–8 || Gross || Langston (5–4) || Henneman || 19,754 || 41–41
|- bgcolor="ccffcc"
| 83 || July 2 || Rangers || 6–5 || James (5–3) || Henneman || — || 19,055 || 42–41
|- bgcolor="ffbbbb"
| 84 || July 3 || Rangers || 1–8 || Pavlik || Finley (9–7) || — || 45,979 || 42–42
|- bgcolor="ffbbbb"
| 85 || July 4 || @ Athletics || 7–8 (11) || Taylor || Monteleone (0–2) || — || 14,144 || 42–43
|- bgcolor="ffbbbb"
| 86 || July 5 || @ Athletics || 8–16 || Wasdin || Hancock (4–1) || — || 36,129 || 42–44
|- bgcolor="ffbbbb"
| 87 || July 6 || @ Athletics || 5–6 (10) || Taylor || James (5–4) || — || 14,294 || 42–45
|- bgcolor="ccffcc"
| 88 || July 7 || @ Athletics || 9–4 || Boskie (9–3) || Johns || — || 16,526 || 43–45
|- bgcolor="ffbbbb"
| 89 || July 11 || @ Mariners || 4–5 (12) || Carmona || Monteleone (0–3) || — || 25,949 || 43–46
|- bgcolor="ffbbbb"
| 90 || July 12 || @ Mariners || 6–7 (10) || Ayala || McElroy (4–1) || — || 29,618 || 43–47
|- bgcolor="ccffcc"
| 91 || July 13 || @ Mariners || 6–4 || Boskie (10–3) || Ayala || Percival (23) || 37,792 || 44–47
|- bgcolor="ffbbbb"
| 92 || July 14 || @ Mariners || 0–8 || Wells || Grimsley (4–6) || — || 33,243 || 44–48
|- bgcolor="ccffcc"
| 93 || July 15 || @ Rangers || 10–7 || Schmidt (1–0) || Brandenburg || Percival (24) || 45,655 || 45–48
|- bgcolor="ffbbbb"
| 94 || July 16 || @ Rangers || 2–6 || Oliver || Abbott (1–12) || Russell || 34,680 || 45–49
|- bgcolor="ffbbbb"
| 95 || July 17 || @ Rangers || 3–7 || Hill || Finley (9–8) || — || 44,220 || 45–50
|- bgcolor="ffbbbb"
| 96 || July 18 || Mariners || 3–15 || Meacham || Boskie (10–4) || — || 22,780 || 45–51
|- bgcolor="ccffcc"
| 97 || July 19 || Mariners || 9–4 || Grimsley (5–6) || Wells || — || 23,332 || 46–51
|- bgcolor="ccffcc"
| 98 || July 20 || Mariners || 5–4 || Schmidt (2–0) || Charlton || Percival (25) || 31,759 || 47–51
|- bgcolor="ffbbbb"
| 99 || July 21 || Mariners || 2–6 || Hitchcock || Abbott (1–13) || — || 22,088 || 47–52
|- bgcolor="ccffcc"
| 100 || July 22 || Tigers || 1–0 || Finley (10–8) || Olivares || Percival (26) || 16,336 || 48–52
|- bgcolor="ffbbbb"
| 101 || July 23 || Tigers || 3–8 || Lima || James (5–5) || — || 16,432 || 48–53
|- bgcolor="ccffcc"
| 102 || July 25 || Brewers || 5–4 || Holtz (1–0) || Lloyd || — || 16,841 || 49–53
|- bgcolor="ccffcc"
| 103 || July 26 || Brewers || 6–5 || Springer (1–0) || D'Amico || Percival (27) || 18,189 || 50–53
|- bgcolor="ccffcc"
| 104 || July 27 || Brewers || 7–0 || Finley (11–8) || McDonald || — || 17,497 || 51–53
|- bgcolor="ffbbbb"
| 105 || July 28 || Brewers || 3–4 (13) || Miranda || Holtz (1–1) || Garcia || 25,539 || 51–54
|- bgcolor="ffbbbb"
| 106 || July 30 || @ Tigers || 9–12 || Nitkowski || Grimsley (5–7) || — || 11,641 || 51–55
|- bgcolor="ffbbbb"
| 107 || July 31 || @ Tigers || 5–10 || Lima || Holtz (1–2) || — || 9,740 || 51–56
|-

|- bgcolor="ffbbbb"
| 108 || August 1 || @ Tigers || 5–13 || Williams || Boskie (10–5) || — || 14,591 || 51–57
|- bgcolor="ffbbbb"
| 109 || August 2 || @ Blue Jays || 2–9 || Hentgen || Finley (11–9) || — || 30,261 || 51–58
|- bgcolor="ccffcc"
| 110 || August 3 || @ Blue Jays || 11–6 || Langston (6–4) || Castillo || — || 32,139 || 52–58
|- bgcolor="ffbbbb"
| 111 || August 4 || @ Blue Jays || 1–7 || Flener || Abbott (1–14) || — || 30,253 || 52–59
|- bgcolor="ffbbbb"
| 112 || August 6 || Twins || 1–4 || Radke || Springer (1–1) || Guardado || 20,058 || 52–60
|- bgcolor="ffbbbb"
| 113 || August 7 || Twins || 0–4 || Robertson || Finley (11–10) || — || 18,611 || 52–61
|- bgcolor="ffbbbb"
| 114 || August 8 || Twins || 5–13 || Aguilera || Boskie (10–6) || — || 21,283 || 52–62
|- bgcolor="ffbbbb"
| 115 || August 9 || Royals || 3–5 || Rosado || Langston (6–5) || Montgomery || 35,977 || 52–63
|- bgcolor="ffbbbb"
| 116 || August 10 || Royals || 3–18 || Haney || Abbott (1–15) || — || 21,657 || 52–64
|- bgcolor="ccffcc"
| 117 || August 11 || Royals || 6–5 || Springer (2–1) || Belcher || — || 18,591 || 53–64
|- bgcolor="ffbbbb"
| 118 || August 12 || Indians || 4–5 || Hershiser || Finley (11–11) || Mesa || 19,499 || 53–65
|- bgcolor="ccffcc"
| 119 || August 13 || Indians || 4–2 || Boskie (11–6) || Ogea || Percival (28) || 19,569 || 54–65
|- bgcolor="ccffcc"
| 120 || August 14 || Indians || 8–7 || Gohr (1–0) || McDowell || Percival (29) || 23,887 || 55–65
|- bgcolor="ccffcc"
| 121 || August 16 || @ Red Sox || 6–3 || Springer (3–1) || Wakefield || Percival (30) || 30,693 || 56–65
|- bgcolor="ffbbbb"
| 122 || August 17 || @ Red Sox || 0–6 || Clemens || Finley (11–12) || — || 32,497 || 56–66
|- bgcolor="ccffcc"
| 123 || August 18 || @ Red Sox || 4–3 || Holtz (2–2) || Brandenburg || Percival (31) || 25,224 || 57–66
|- bgcolor="ffbbbb"
| 124 || August 19 || @ Red Sox || 9–10 || Lacy || Gohr (1–1) || Slocumb || 25,779 || 57–67
|- bgcolor="ffbbbb"
| 125 || August 20 || @ Yankees || 6–17 || Boehringer || Springer (3–2) || — || 20,795 || 57–68
|- bgcolor="ccffcc"
| 126 || August 21 || @ Yankees || 7–1 || Dickson (1–0) || Key || Percival (32) || 27,811 || 58–68
|- bgcolor="ccffcc"
| 127 || August 22 || @ Yankees || 12–3 || Finley (12–12) || Rogers || — || 27,191 || 59–68
|- bgcolor="ccffcc"
| 128 || August 23 || @ Orioles || 2–0 || Boskie (12–6) || Wells || Percival (33) || 47,291 || 60–68
|- bgcolor="ffbbbb"
| 129 || August 24 || @ Orioles || 4–5 || Mussina || Abbott (1–16) || Myers || 46,487 || 60–69
|- bgcolor="ccffcc"
| 130 || August 25 || @ Orioles || 13–0 || Springer (4–2) || Erickson || — || 47,239 || 61–69
|- bgcolor="ffbbbb"
| 131 || August 26 || Red Sox || 1–4 || Wakefield || Dickson (1–1) || — || 16,886 || 61–70
|- bgcolor="ffbbbb"
| 132 || August 27 || Red Sox || 1–2 || Clemens || Finley (12–13) || Slocumb || 19,947 || 61–71
|- bgcolor="ffbbbb"
| 133 || August 28 || Red Sox || 4–7 || Gordon || Boskie (12–7) || — || 20,894 || 61–72
|- bgcolor="ccffcc"
| 134 || August 29 || Yankees || 14–3 || Holtz (3–2) || Whitehurst || — || 19,755 || 62–72
|- bgcolor="ffbbbb"
| 135 || August 30 || Yankees || 2–6 || Pettitte || Springer (4–3) || — || 27,084 || 62–73
|- bgcolor="ffbbbb"
| 136 || August 31 || Yankees || 3–14 || Key || Dickson (1–2) || — || 28,749 || 62–74
|-

|- bgcolor="ccffcc"
| 137 || September 1 || Yankees || 4–0 || Finley (13–13) || Rogers || — || 19,384 || 63–74
|- bgcolor="ffbbbb"
| 138 || September 2 || Orioles || 8–12 || Mussina || Boskie (12–8) || — || 20,287 || 63–75
|- bgcolor="ccffcc"
| 139 || September 3 || Orioles || 10–2 || Harris (1–0) || Coppinger || — || 15,924 || 64–75
|- bgcolor="ffbbbb"
| 140 || September 4 || Orioles || 2–4 || Erickson || Springer (4–4) || Myers || 18,204 || 64–76
|- bgcolor="ffbbbb"
| 141 || September 6 || @ Twins || 2–6 || Radke || Finley (13–14) || — || 13,006 || 64–77
|- bgcolor="ffbbbb"
| 142 || September 7 || @ Twins || 3–6 || Stevens || Boskie (12–9) || Trombley || 51,011 || 64–78
|- bgcolor="ccffcc"
| 143 || September 8 || @ Twins || 4–2 || Abbott (2–16) || Rodriguez || Percival (34) || 14,378 || 65–78
|- bgcolor="ffbbbb"
| 144 || September 9 || @ Indians || 3–4 || Shuey || Holtz (3–3) || Mesa || 42,208 || 65–79
|- bgcolor="ffbbbb"
| 145 || September 10 || @ Indians || 5–7 || Assenmacher || Percival (0–2) || — || 42,181 || 65–80
|- bgcolor="ffbbbb"
| 146 || September 11 || @ Indians || 0–2 || McDowell || Finley (13–15) || Mesa || 42,264 || 65–81
|- bgcolor="ffbbbb"
| 147 || September 12 || @ Indians || 2–11 || Anderson || Boskie (12–10) || — || 42,244 || 65–82
|- bgcolor="ffbbbb"
| 148 || September 13 || @ Royals || 2–8 || Belcher || Abbott (2–17) || — || 13,083 || 65–83
|- bgcolor="ffbbbb"
| 149 || September 14 || @ Royals || 5–8 || Appier || Dickson (1–3) || — || 17,174 || 65–84
|- bgcolor="ffbbbb"
| 150 || September 17 || Athletics || 1–5 || Prieto || Springer (4–5) || — || 17,827 || 65–85
|- bgcolor="ccffcc"
| 151 || September 18 || Athletics || 3–1 || Finley (14–15) || Adams || Percival (35) || 18,213 || 66–85
|- bgcolor="ccffcc"
| 152 || September 20 || Rangers || 6–5 (10) || McElroy (5–1) || Stanton || — || 18,860 || 67–85
|- bgcolor="ffbbbb"
| 153 || September 21 || Rangers || 1–7 || Burkett || Abbott (2–18) || — || 24,104 || 67–86
|- bgcolor="ffbbbb"
| 154 || September 22 || Rangers || 1–4 || Hill || Dickson (1–4) || — || 17,522 || 67–87
|- bgcolor="ccffcc"
| 155 || September 23 || Mariners || 4–3 || Finley (15–15) || Hitchcock || Percival (36) || 16,212 || 68–87
|- bgcolor="ccffcc"
| 156 || September 24 || Mariners || 11–6 || Springer (5–5) || Wells || — || 18,891 || 69–87
|- bgcolor="ffbbbb"
| 157 || September 25 || Mariners || 2–11 || Torres || Boskie (12–11) || — || 17,160 || 69–88
|- bgcolor="ffbbbb"
| 158 || September 26 || @ Rangers || 5–6 || Burkett || Abbott (2–19) || Henneman || 33,895 || 69–89
|- bgcolor="ccffcc"
| 159 || September 27 || @ Rangers || 4–3 (15) || Harris (2–0) || Whiteside || Gohr (1) || 46,764 || 70–89
|- bgcolor="ffbbbb"
| 160 || September 28 || @ Rangers || 3–4 || Oliver || Finley (15–16) || Heredia || 45,651 || 70–90
|- bgcolor="ffbbbb"
| 161 || September 29 || @ Rangers || 3–4 || Witt || Springer (5–6) || — || 45,434 || 70–91
|-

|-
| Legend:       = Win       = LossBold = Angels team member

Detailed records

Notable transactions
May 16, 1996: Scott Sanderson was released by the California Angels.
May 27, 1996: Lee Smith was traded by the California Angels to the Cincinnati Reds for Chuck McElroy.
June 30, 1996: Vince Coleman signed as a free agent with the California Angels.
September 6, 1996: Robert Eenhoorn was selected off waivers by the California Angels from the New York Yankees.

Roster

Player stats

Batting

Starters by position
Note: Pos = Position; G = Games played; AB = At bats; H = Hits; Avg. = Batting average; HR = Home runs; RBI = Runs batted in

Other batters
Note: G = Games played; AB = At bats; H = Hits; Avg. = Batting average; HR = Home runs; RBI = Runs batted in

Pitching

Starting pitchers
Note: G = Games pitched; IP = Innings pitched; W = Wins; L = Losses; ERA = Earned run average; SO = Strikeouts

Other pitchers
Note: G = Games pitched; IP = Innings pitched; W = Wins; L = Losses; ERA = Earned run average; SO = Strikeouts

Relief pitchers
Note: G = Games pitched; W = Wins; L = Losses; SV = Saves; ERA = Earned run average; SO = Strikeouts

Farm system

LEAGUE CHAMPIONS: Lake Elsinore

References

1996 California Angels at Baseball Reference
1996 California Angels  at Baseball Almanac

Los Angeles Angels seasons
Los
Los